The following list is of important municipalities (those with largest populations) in Andalusia, an autonomous community of Spain:

Provincial lists
The following links are to province-specific lists which are more detailed, where all municipalities in a given province are ranked alphabetically. 
List of municipalities in Almería province
List of municipalities in Cádiz province
List of municipalities in Córdoba province
List of municipalities in Granada province
List of municipalities in Huelva province
List of municipalities in Jaén province
List of municipalities in Málaga province
List of municipalities in Sevilla province

By population
The largest municipalities are listed below, ranked by population in 2019 (over 40,000 inhabitants).

References